The fifth season of Psych, consisting of 16 episodes, premiered on USA Network in the United States on July 14, 2010 and concluded on December 22, 2010.  A DVD of the season was released on May 31, 2011.  Production officially started in Vancouver, British Columbia on April 28, 2010.  James Roday, Dulé Hill, Timothy Omundson, Maggie Lawson, Corbin Bernsen and Kirsten Nelson all reprised their roles as the main characters.

Production
Steve Franks continued in his role of showrunner.  "I Know, You Know", performed by The Friendly Indians, continued to serve as the show's theme song, though the title sequence was changed four times.  For the episode "Romeo and Juliet and Juliet", the main titles were translated into Chinese.  For "Shawn 2.0", guest star Curt Smith recorded an interpretation of the theme, and Julee Cruise performed a slower extended version for "Dual Spires".  The theme song used originally for "Gus's Dad May Have Killed an Old Guy" in the second season was used once again for "The Polarizing Express".  Curt Smith also recorded an original song, entitled "This is Christmas", for the episode.

Mel Damski directed four episodes for the season, while Steve Franks directed two.  John Badham, Andrew Bernstein, Jay Chandrasekhar, Tawnia McKiernan, James Roday, Matt Shakman, and Stephen Surjik directed one episode each.  David Crabtree and Reginald Hudlin joined the series to direct one episode each.  Andy Berman began his directing career with the episode "Dead Bear Walking".

Berman also wrote four episodes for the season.  Bill Callahan wrote four as well, while Steve Franks, Saladin K. Patterson, and James Roday wrote three.  Kell Cahoon and Tim Meltreger wrote two episodes each.

Cast

James Roday continued to play fake psychic detective Shawn Spencer.  Burton "Gus" Guster returned, portrayed by Dulé Hill.  Timothy Omundson returned as Head Detective Carlton "Lassie" Lassiter, while Maggie Lawson continued to portray Juliet "Jules" O'Hara.  Corbin Bernsen remained in his role as Henry Spencer, who, as of the first episode, had returned to the SBPD part-time.  Kirsten Nelson continued to portray SBPD Chief Karen Vick.

Sage Brocklebank returned as Officer Buzz McNab, Kurt Fuller returned as Woody the Coroner, and Liam James and Carlos McCullers II reprised their roles as young Shawn and young Gus, respectively.  Liam James was abruptly replaced midway through the season by Skyler Gisondo.  Nestor Carbonell appeared in two episodes  as Declan Rand, a criminal profiler who briefly dates Juliet.  Jerry Shea appeared in two episodes as well, as Ken, an assistant for the Psych offices.  In the mid-season premiere, Cary Elwes returned as Despereaux, and Peter Oldring and Ed Lauter returned as Canadian officers. Ray Wise returned as Father Westley in a Twin Peaks-themed episode.  In the season finale, Ally Sheedy returned as Mr. Yang and Peter Weller appeared as Mr. Yin (and was revealed to be Yang's father), while Cybill Shepherd returned as Madeleine Spencer and Jimmi Simpson appeared in videotape footage of Yin/Yang expert profiler Mary Lightly (since Lightly had been killed in the previous season, this marked the first of several post-death appearances for the character).  Other notable guest stars for the season included Kevin Alejandro, Dana Ashbrook, Doron Bell Jr., April Bowlby, Catherine E. Coulson, Tony Cox, John DeSantis, William Devane, Nora Dunn, Sherilyn Fenn, Lee Garlington, Jon Gries, Michael Gross, Danielle Harris, John Michael Higgins, C. Thomas Howell, Brian Klugman, Rob LaBelle, Don Lake, Sheryl Lee, Robyn Lively, Bruce Locke, Ralph Macchio, Angus Macfadyen, April Matson, Chi McBride, Ryan McDonald, Vanessa Minnillo, Meredith Monroe, Becky O'Donohue, Franka Potente, Freddie Prinze, Jr., Keshia Knight Pulliam, Brad Raider, Adam Reid, Adam Rodriguez, Jean Smart, Charles Martin Smith, Curt Smith, Lauren Lee Smith, Mena Suvari, Jacob Vargas, Lenny Von Dohlen, and Carl Weathers.

Episodes

References

Psych

2010 American television seasons